Farmington is a census-designated place (CDP) in San Joaquin County, California. The population was 172 at the 2020 census, down from 207 at the 2010 census.

History
Farmington was so named to distinguish its agricultural setting from the nearby mining regions.

Geography
Farmington is located at  (37.929625, -120.999574). 
The town has a school, firehouse, bar, Circle K, Shell gas station, general store, and post office. Barren, low hills lie to the immediate east of the town, and farther east are the Sierra Nevada mountains. Stockton East Creek flows along the southern border of Farmington, paralleling Highway 4 for a short distance. The creek and many other places nearby were used as locations in the 1958 film The Big Country, as was scenes for the movie, Dirty Mary, Crazy Larry (1974).

Demographics

2010
The 2010 United States Census reported that Farmington had a population of 207. The racial makeup of Farmington was 164 (79.2%) White, 7 (3.4%) African American, 1 (0.5%) Native American, 6 (2.9%) Asian, 0 (0.0%) Pacific Islander, 18 (8.7%) from other races, and 11 (5.3%) from two or more races. Hispanic or Latino of any race were 42 persons (20.3%).

The Census reported that 207 people (100% of the population) lived in households, 0 (0%) lived in non-institutionalized group quarters, and 0 (0%) were institutionalized.

There were 79 households, out of which 26 (32.9%) had children under the age of 18 living in them, 46 (58.2%) were opposite-sex married couples living together, 5 (6.3%) had a female householder with no husband present, 6 (7.6%) had a male householder with no wife present.  There were 6 (7.6%) unmarried opposite-sex partnerships, and 0 (0%) same-sex married couples or partnerships. 14 households (17.7%) were made up of individuals, and 7 (8.9%) had someone living alone who was 65 years of age or older. The average household size was 2.62.  There were 57 families (72.2% of all households); the average family size was 2.98.

The population was spread out, with 45 people (21.7%) under the age of 18, 13 people (6.3%) aged 18 to 24, 49 people (23.7%) aged 25 to 44, 73 people (35.3%) aged 45 to 64, and 27 people (13.0%) who were 65 years of age or older.  The median age was 43.9 years. For every 100 females, there were 102.9 males.  For every 100 females age 18 and over, there were 102.5 males.

The homeowner vacancy rate was 11.5%; the rental vacancy rate was 10.7%.  128 people (61.8% of the population) lived in owner-occupied housing units and 79 people (38.2%) lived in rental housing units.

2000
As of the census of 2000, there were 262 people, 84 households, and 67 families residing in the CDP. The racial makeup of the CDP was 72.90% White, 1.53% Asian, 15.65% from other races, and 9.92% from two or more races. Hispanic or Latino of any race were 26.34% of the population.

There were 84 households, out of which 35.7% had children under the age of 18 living with them, 63.1% were married couples living together, 10.7% had a female householder with no husband present, and 20.2% were non-families. 16.7% of all households were made up of individuals, and 3.6% had someone living alone who was 65 years of age or older.  The average household size was 3.12 and the average family size was 3.48.

In the CDP, the population was spread out, with 30.2% under the age of 18, 7.3% from 18 to 24, 21.8% from 25 to 44, 26.7% from 45 to 64, and 14.1% who were 65 years of age or older.  The median age was 36 years. For every 100 females, there were 106.3 males.  For every 100 females age 18 and over, there were 101.1 males.

The median income for a household in the CDP was $32,614, and the median income for a family was $32,727. Males had a median income of $20,250 versus $35,357 for females. The per capita income for the CDP was $13,289.  About 15.5% of families and 15.3% of the population were below the poverty line, including 19.5% of those under the age of eighteen and none of those sixty-five or over.

References

Census-designated places in San Joaquin County, California
Census-designated places in California